The Social Democratic Party is a centre-left social democratic political party in Rwanda. The party is seen as supportive of the Paul Kagame government.

History
The party was established on 1 July 1991 by Félicien Gatabazi and Frédéric Nzamurambaho, and was nicknamed the "Party of Intellectuals". It formed a bloc opposing President Juvénal Habyarimana alongside the Liberal Party and the Republican Democratic Movement, but by the time of the Rwandan genocide, it was the only major party that Habyarimana had failed to split. The PSD's main leaders were killed in the morning of the first day of the genocide as Théoneste Bagosora sought to create a vacuum in order to seize power.

At the end of the genocide the party joined the national unity government. It supported President Paul Kagame in the 2003 presidential elections, and received 12% of the vote in the 2003 parliamentary elections, winning seven seats.

The party's vote share rose to 13% in the 2008 elections, as it retained its seven seats. In the 2010 presidential elections the party fielded Jean Damascene Ntawukuriryayo as its candidate; he received 5% of the vote, coming second to Kagame, who received 93%.

In the 2013 parliamentary elections the party again received 13% of the vote, winning seven seats. It was reduced to five seats in the 2018 elections.

Electoral history

Presidential elections

Chamber of Deputies elections

References

External links
Official website

Political parties in Rwanda
Political parties established in 1991
1991 establishments in Rwanda
Social democratic parties